Hollywood Casino Lawrenceburg is a casino in Lawrenceburg, Indiana, US, in the Cincinnati metropolitan area. It is owned by Gaming and Leisure Properties and operated by Penn Entertainment.

History 
The casino was originally named Argosy Casino, and was operated by Argosy Gaming Company. In 2004, Argosy was acquired by Penn National Gaming (now Penn Entertainment).

In June 2009, Penn National unveiled a much larger riverboat with a passenger capacity of nearly 9,000 guests and 4,400 gaming positions. The new boat also marked the changeover from the Argosy name to Penn National's primary brand, Hollywood Casino. The new boat also features a rebranded World Poker Tour poker room.

References

See also
 List of casinos in Indiana

Casinos in Indiana
Buildings and structures in Dearborn County, Indiana
Tourist attractions in Dearborn County, Indiana
Riverboat casinos
2009 establishments in Indiana